Dabaozi is a rural town in Jingzhou Miao and Dong Autonomous County, Hunan, China. The town shares a border with Sanjiang Town of Jinping County to the west, Aoshang Town to the east, Zhulin Township of Tianzhu County to the north, and Sanqiao Township to the south.

History
In 1994 it was upgraded to a town.

Administrative division
As of 2017, the town is divided into 17 villages: Fangjiang, Qianjin, Mutang, Damu, Yanwan, Tongle, Sanjiang, Meizi, Tangkuan, Yanzhai, Baozi, Shanghe, Huangtan, Niuchang, Miaochong, Yangjia, Jiangchong, and one community: Baozi Community.

Geography
The Guangping River passes through the town south to north.

References

Towns of Huaihua
Jingzhou Miao and Dong Autonomous County